Kartchner Caverns State Park is a state park of Arizona, United States, featuring a show cave with  of passages. Long hidden from view, the caverns were discovered in 1974 by local cavers, assisted by state biologist Erick Campbell who helped in its preservation.

The park encompasses most of a down-dropped block of Palaeozoic rocks on the east flank of the Whetstone Mountains.

The caverns are carved out of limestone and filled with spectacular speleothems which have been growing for 50,000 years or longer, and are still growing.  Careful and technical cave state park development and maintenance are designed to preserve the cave system.

History 

Randy Tufts, PhD, who at the time of his death was a geologist and lunar and planetary scientist for NASA, was introduced to caving as a young boy by his maternal uncle, also a geologist. His uncle showed him caves in Arizona that had been vandalized in various ways including graffiti, litter, and the theft of stalactites and stalagmites. At the age of 13, Randy read an English children's adventure book entitled, "Five Boys in a Cave," and inspired, he decided that he wanted to find a cave that had not ever been vandalized and protect it. For years, Randy would take his friends out to the Whetstone limestone mountain range looking for caves, walking a grid, with no success until they asked a local miner if he had ever heard of a local cave. The miner pointed to the foothills below them. There they foundand nearly fell intoa deep sink hole.
At the time, although they had found a sink hole and a small cave chamber, they did not think that the cave "went" anywhere.

It was years later when Randy was on a picnic luncheon date, that he found another sink hole. He went home to get his caving gear and asked Gary Tenen to join him to explore the new sink hole. That new sink hole was also disappointing, but Randy and Gary decided upon a whim to return to the prior sink hole. This time they could smell bat guano, a hint that the cave might be much larger than they had originally thought. It was after crawling about the length of a football field, sometimes on their bellies, with only carbide lamps for light, that they came to a very small bat hole. After chipping away at the hole for hours they entered the "Big Room". While there, they realized that this discovery could place the caverns at risk.

Hoping to protect the cave from vandalism, they kept the location a secret for 14 years, deciding that the best way to preserve the cavernwhich was near a freewaywas to develop it as a tour cave. After gaining the cooperation of the Kartchner family and working with them for ten years, together they approached the Arizona State Parks Board. In 1985, The Nature Conservancy acquired an option to purchase the land. The discovery of the cave was finally made public in 1988 when the landowners sold the area to the state for development as a park and show cavern. Prior to its grand opening in 1999, the state spent $28 million on a high-tech system of air-lock doors, misting machines and other equipment designed to preserve the cave.

Tourism information 

The two major features of the caverns accessible to the public are the Throne Room and the Big Room. The Big Room contains the world's most extensive formation of brushite moonmilk. Big Room cave tours are closed during the summer for several months (April 15 to October 15) each year because it is a nursery roost for cave bats, however the Throne Room tours remain open year-round.

Other features publicly accessible within the caverns include Mud Flats, Rotunda Room, Strawberry Room, and Cul-de-sac Passage. Approximately 60% of the cave system is not open to the public.

The park has hiking trails on the ground above the caverns. The longest trail, the Guindani Trail, is 4.2 miles, while the shorter trail, the Foothills Loop Trail, measures 2.5 miles.

Animal life 
Although the cave is largely uninhabited, as many as 2000 Myotis velifer bats nest in the cave during late spring.

Cave formations and vegetation

Many different cave formations can be found within the caves and the surrounding park. These include cave bacon, helictites, soda straws, stalactites, stalagmites and others. Cave formations like the stalactites and stalagmites grow approximately a 16th of an inch every 100 years.

Along the Foothills Loop Trail hike, desert plants may be observed: ocotillo, creosote bush, mesquite, desert broom, acacia, wait-a-minute bush, scrub oak, barrel cactus, prickly pear, buckhorn cholla, and hackberry.

Sister caves
  Frasassi Caves  (Genga, Italy)

References

Further reading
 Miller, Neil. Kartchner Caverns: How Two Cavers Discovered and Saved One of the Wonders of the Natural World, 2008, University of Arizona Press. 
 Larkin, Bruce. Kartchner Caverns, 2009, Wilbooks. .

External links

 Kartchner Caverns State Park website

1988 establishments in Arizona
Caves of Arizona
Parks in Cochise County, Arizona
Protected areas established in 1988
San Pedro Valley (Arizona)
Show caves in the United States
Sonoran Desert
State parks of Arizona
Landforms of Cochise County, Arizona